= Ethiopian Women Exporters' Association =

Ethiopian organization of women entrepreneurship

Ethiopian Women Exporters’ Association is an organization supporting the export activities of its 40 member companies. The association evolved from Ethiopian Women Exporter's Forum, which was established in 2000 by Ethiopian women entrepreneurs with the chief aim of strengthening the capacity of local women exporters. The forum turned into the Association in January 2006.

All the companies have been established and managed by woman entrepreneurs and are active in five sectors:

- Coffee
- Flowers
- Handicraft and jewelry
- Leather
- Textiles
